ADVA Optical Networking SE is a European telecommunications vendor that provides network equipment for data, storage, voice and video services. ADVA has a global workforce of over 1,900 employees and its FSP 3000 has been deployed in more than 250 carriers and 10,000 enterprises. It was founded in 1994 by Brian Protiva.

Corporate history

ADVA was founded in 1994 by Brian Protiva. It established its headquarters in Martinsried in Munich (district) and its first production facility in Meiningen. Funded by Egora Holding, the company's initial focus was on the development of wavelength division multiplexing technology designed to provide enterprises, including banks, insurance firms and utilities, with high-bandwidth network connectivity.

Acquisitions
In 2014, ADVA Optical Networking acquired Oscilloquartz. Following the purchase, ADVA continued to expand and develop Oscilloquartz's portfolio of end-to-end synchronization technology.

In 2016, ADVA acquired Overture.

In 2017, ADVA Optical Networking acquired its US rival, MRV Communications in an effort to increase its cloud access portfolio and strengthen its Network Edge portfolio. Following the acquisition, one MRV executive, Scott St. John, was appointed to ADVA's board.

Market share
In 2009, Infonetics Research listed ADVA as the industry leader (#1 position) in the Ethernet Access Device (EAD) space with a market share of 20 percent, based on 2008 revenues.

In 2016, ADVA was listed as the industry leader (#1 position) in Ovum's data center interconnect (DCI) global market share report, with the largest market share in both the metro ICP/CNP and enterprise categories.

Recent history

ADVA's annual revenues surpassed half a billion euros in 2016, peaking at 556.7 million euros.

ADVA demonstrated the world's first 100G quantum safe transport over 2800 km on 13 June 2018. 

ADVA's FSP 3000 TeraFlex terminal broke industry records on 24 July 2019, achieving 200Gbit/s per wavelength transmission over a distance of 5,738 km with 2.5bit/symbol, and 500Gbit/s over 1,016 km with 5bit/symbol modulation. The trial was conducted with partners: the Poznan Supercomputing and Networking Center (PSNC), EENet of HITSA and Tele2 Estonia. Marketwatch

ADVA announced in August 2021 that they are planning a merger with ADTRAN in an all-stock transaction with ADTRAN shareholders to own approximately 54% and ADVA shareholders to own approximately 46% of the combined company.

Awards

 10 March 2021: ADVA won two MEF Proof of Concept (POC) awards. The Judge's Choice Award was for ADVA's multi-vendor live video showcase which utilized network slices and uCPE. ADVA also received the Market Game Changer Award for its demo of multi-edge cloud services.
 2 February 2021 ADVA won the TIA QuEST Forum Global Sustainability Award  for Excellence in Network Equipment. These annual awards acknowledge outstanding performance and innovation in sustainability practices
 25 November 2019: ADVA jointly won MEF 19 Proof of Concept (POC) award in the category of MEF 3.0 SD-WAN Implementation 
 14 October 2019: ADVA was chosen to be included in the Intel Network Builders Winners' Circle for its work on next generation solutions for universal customer premises equipment (uCPE).
 21 March 2019: ADVA won the BT sustainability award for a second time for its Carrier Ethernet demarcation solution.
 18 October 2018: ADVA received the ECOC (European Conference on Optical Communication) award for low-latency timing-accurate 5G technology along with partner, Transpacket.
 16 November 2017: ADVA won the MEF 2017 Carrier Ethernet 2.0 (CE 2.0) award for its FSP 150 ProVMe (P2.4) solution.
 16 October 2017: ADVA received the Layer 123 2017 Network Transformation Award in the category of Best Energy Efficiency.
 22 September 2017: ADVA's Ensemble Connector software hosting platform for virtual network functions (VNFs) won the Telecom World Award for vendor innovation. 
 20 January 2017: Ensemble Connector received TMC's NFV Product of the Year award. 
 12 May 2016: Ensemble Connector won the title of Innovation of the Year at 5G World MENA.

Sustainability

In 2016, ADVA announced it was joining the Science Based Targets initiative (SBTi), an organisation set up by the World Resources Institute. ADVA joined the initiative with the aim of contributing to the global effort to keep the average global temperature below a 1.5 °C rise beyond pre-industrial levels, in line with the 2015 Paris Agreement. In 2017, ADVA submitted its targets, which were primarily focused on reducing indirect consumer emissions, to the SBTi. The SBTi validated ADVA's targets in 2019.

On October 8, 2020, ADVA announced a new commitment via a press release: it would achieve a 67% reduction in emissions from its operations by the year 2032.

References

Telecommunications companies of Germany
Meiningen
Munich (district)
Companies based in Upper Bavaria